Napkin protest is an online protest on social media, against the alleged strip search carried on 15 women in Kochi, Kerala by Asma Rubber Products Pvt Ltd.

On 10 December 2014, 15 female employees of Asma Rubber Products Pvt Ltd, a glove manufacturing company, located in Cochin Special Economic Zone (CSEZ), were strip searched by two women supervisors, after a used sanitary napkin was found inside the toilet. One of the supervisors asked all of the women, except those who didn't have a uterus, to come to the toilet and subjected them to a strip search. After that, those employees who protested against strip search were threatened with sacking. On 19 December 2014, a few employees, aged 20-50, filed a police complaint. They stated that they were affected mentally by this incident.

The Development Commissioner of Cochin Special Economic Zone (CSEZ) set up the 4 member committee to investigate the matter. They collected the information and CCTV footage from the company. Also they collected the statements from the women and management.

After this incident the factory executives started receiving used napkins in the mail, as a sign of protest.

Following the protest in social media, a probe had been ordered into the incident and Kerala High Court was expected to hear the case on January 2, 2014.

References

Internet-based activism
2014 in India
Protests in India
Strip search
Feminine hygiene
History of Kochi
Women's rights in India